Kenneth ("Ken") Michael Carpenter (born December 31, 1965) is a retired American road bicycle racer and track racer, who represented the United States at the 1988 and 1992 Summer Olympics. He won the Men's 200m Match Sprint at the 1987 Pan American Games. Carpenter was a professional rider from 1992 to 1995.

References

External links

1965 births
Living people
American male cyclists
Cyclists from California
Cyclists at the 1987 Pan American Games
Cyclists at the 1988 Summer Olympics
Cyclists at the 1992 Summer Olympics
Olympic cyclists of the United States
People from La Mesa, California
Pan American Games gold medalists for the United States
Pan American Games medalists in cycling
Medalists at the 1987 Pan American Games
20th-century American people